Christopher Larson (born 1 October 1991) is a Bahamian international footballer who played college soccer for The Catholic University of America, as a midfielder.

Playing career

Club
Larson played college soccer in the United States for the Catholic University Cardinals. He scored six goals in 63 games for the Cardinals.

International
He made his international debut for Bahamas in a July 2011 FIFA World Cup qualification match against the Turks and Caicos Islands , and has appeared in FIFA World Cup qualifying matches.

References

1991 births
Living people
Sportspeople from Nassau, Bahamas
Association football midfielders
Bahamian footballers
Bahamas international footballers
College men's soccer players in the United States
Catholic University of America alumni